Elle Schneider (born November 11, 1985) is an American filmmaker and camera developer, best known as co-producer and director of photography on the 2014 documentary That Guy Dick Miller, and for her work creating the Digital Bolex cinema camera.

Brief Biography
Schneider, originally from New York City, is a 2008 graduate of the University of Southern California School of Cinematic Arts. She was a screenwriting major with a minor in the USC Interactive Media & Games Division. After graduation she worked as a game producer and user interface designer for online math and science games.

Digital Bolex
Schneider was originally hired to direct promotional material for the Digital Bolex cinema camera in summer of 2011. During development of the camera, she became involved in the user interface design and physical attributes of the camera, including the digital crank. After the launch of the camera at the 2012 SXSW Film Festival, she became the creative director (CCO) and co-owner of the company. Since 2012, Schneider has been invited to speak at Massachusetts Institute of Technology's #HackingArts Conference, VidCon, CCW Expo at the Javits Center, and other technology conferences. She was cited by Indiewire on their lists  of 40 Female Filmmakers and 100 Filmmakers to Follow on Twitter.

Career
Schneider has worked as a writer, director, and first and second unit cinematographer, mostly on short films and documentaries. She was one of several cinematographers on Jeffrey Schwarz's documentary feature I Am Divine, which premiered at the 2013 SXSW Film Festival and played at more than a dozen international film festivals. She was co-producer and director of photographer of 2014 film That Guy Dick Miller which also premiered at SXSW, and was programmed at RiverRun International Film Festival, Filmfest München, Mile High Horror Film Festival, Edinburgh International Film Festival, Sitges Film Festival, and MOTELx. Schneider also shot segments of Troma features Return to Nuke 'Em High Vol.1 and the upcoming Vol.2.

Short films Schneider has directed have played at festivals including the HollyShorts Film Festival, the San Diego Film Festival, the San Antonio Film Festival, and the Short Film Corner at the Cannes Film Festival. She has also directed commercials for Digital Bolex, and the music video for "Keep Talking" by Brooklyn band Gangstagrass, Emmy-nominated for the theme song to FX series Justified. The video features Joelle Carter, a lead actress on Justified, and was shot on the set of the show.

Schneider co-wrote the story for the first season of massively popular web series Video Game High School. VGHS,  produced by Freddie Wong's RocketJump Studios, has earned more than 10 million views per episode.

Activism

Schneider has been a vocal proponent for women behind the camera. In 2012, Schneider identified a lack of opportunities for women cinematographers and directors in her press interviews about Digital Bolex and began work on a grant aimed at women which was announced in March 2014. She further discussed discrimination of women cinematographers in the June 2014 issue of Movie Maker Magazine.

Photography

Schneider has been exhibited a number of times as a photographer, including shows in Los Angeles and Milan during Vogue Italia's 2011 Fashion's Night Out. Schneider was the second unit cinematographer and promotional photographer for Geek & Sundry web series Caper, which premiered on Hulu in 2014. Her cast photos appeared in the Los Angeles Times, io9, and other major online news publications.

References

External links

American documentary film producers
American women cinematographers
American cinematographers
Living people
USC Interactive Media & Games Division alumni
USC School of Cinematic Arts alumni
Film directors from New York City
1985 births
Film producers from New York (state)
American women documentary filmmakers
21st-century American women